"Little Bit of Love" is a song by British musician Tom Grennan. It was released as a digital download and for streaming on 8 January 2021 as the fourth single from his second studio album, Evering Road. The song was written by Dan Bryer, Mike Needle and Grennan.

Background
Grennan announced the release of the single on his Twitter account on 6 January 2021. Talking about the song, he said, "'Little Bit Of Love' is all about the mental struggle of moving on, or going back to a relationship."

Music video
A music video for the song was released on 15 January 2021 at a total length of three minutes and forty-six seconds. The video was directed by Keane Shaw and features Grennan and actor Luke Kelly and was inspired by Tom's relationship with his little brother. Talking about the video Grennan said, "This video is a representation of toxic masculinity and unconditional love, told via a story of two brothers. It was amazing to bring my song to life with one of my closest and long-time friends Keane Shaw, not only a close friend but someone whose artistic vision I admire immensely."

Track listing

Personnel
Credits adapted from Tidal.
 Dan Bryer – producer, composer, lyricist, background vocal, programmer, vocal producer
 Jamie Scott – producer, background vocal
 Lostboy – producer, guitar, piano
 Mike Needle – composer, lyricist, background vocal, vocal producer
 Tom Grennan – composer, lyricist, background vocal, vocal
Alex Charles - backing vocal
 Martin Hannah – engineer
 Matt Cooke – engineer
 Chris Gehringer – mastering engineer
 Dan Grech – mixing engineer

Charts

Weekly charts

Year-end charts

Certifications

References

2021 songs
2021 singles
Tom Grennan songs
Songs written by Dan Bryer
Songs written by Mike Needle
Songs written by Tom Grennan